The Union for Victory Coalition was a coalition of political parties in Albania. The spokesman was Gent Strazimiri. It received 37.1% of the vote and 46 members of parliament in the 2001 election.

Following the 1997 election and the Civil War. The Democratic party of Albania had lost its majority in parliament and as a result it had to continue to be in parliament as opposition. Sali Berisha had been blamed for the governments mishandling of the Pyramid Schemes. In 2001 Berisha and smaller Centrist and Right wing parties formed the "Union for Victory coalition" The Coalition itself was an attempt to change the bad image of 1997, Sali Berisha dressed his deputies in white shirts and formed the Coalition "Union for Victory". While the Coalition itself did make significant gains. It was not enough for Berisha to become Prime Minister of Albania. According to Berisha then leader of the opposition. "The strategy aimed at bringing this coalition to power will replace the power of the mafia with the rule of law. We come to power, he said, to break the snare of misery". Berisha also had presented the slogan "For a new beginning"

Election results

See also
Coalition of the Citizen
Social Albanian Parties – National Unity Party

References

Defunct political parties in Albania
Defunct political party alliances in Europe
Democratic Party of Albania
Political parties with year of establishment missing
Political parties with year of disestablishment missing
Political party alliances in Albania